Wilfred Joseph Cripps  (8 June 1841 – 26 October 1903) was an English antiquarian and a writer on antique silver plate.

Early life
Cripps was born in London into a wealthy family who profited from the wool trade in the Cotswolds and were prominent in Cirencester from the Elizabethan era. His father, William Cripps, and grandfather Joseph Cripps were both members of parliament.

Cripps was educated at Kensington Grammar School, King's College London, and Trinity College, Oxford, where he graduated B.A. in 1863 and M.A. in 1866. He was called in May 1865 to the bar in the Middle Temple and practised for some years on the Oxford circuit.

Career
In the early 1870s W. J. Cripps began research on old English plate. In 1878 he published Old English Plate, which went through nine editions by 1906 and provided valuable information for buyers of antique plate. In June 1880 he was elected a fellow of the Society of Antiquaries of London. He was made a Companion of the Order of the Bath in the 1889 Birthday Honours.

Around the site of the forum of Roman Cirencester, Cripps excavated remains of the basilica and other buildings. He served in the Royal North Gloucestershire Militia and retired with the rank of Major.

Personal life
He was twice married but left no issue. His first marriage was at to Maria Harriet Arabella Daniel-Tyssen (1838–1881) at St Nicholas Church, Brighton on 31 May 1870. Maria was a daughter of Francis Samuel Daniel-Tyssen and sister to Charles Daniel-Tyssen. His second marriage was to Countess Helene von Bismarck-Schierstein (1850–1903) at Ruabon Church, North Wales on 2 December 1884. The Countess was a daughter of Count Friedrich von Bismarck and granddaughter of Sir Henry Williams-Wynn, MP for Midhurst who served as the British Envoy to Denmark.

Cripps died at his residence, Cripps Mead in Cirencester on 26 October 1903.

Selected publications

Articles

Books
;  
;

References

1841 births
1903 deaths
Companions of the Order of the Bath
Antiquarians from London
Fellows of the Society of Antiquaries of London
Alumni of New College, Oxford